Szklarnia may refer to the following places in Poland:
Szklarnia, Lower Silesian Voivodeship (south-west Poland)
Szklarnia, Janów Lubelski County in Lublin Voivodeship (east Poland)
Szklarnia, Lublin County in Lublin Voivodeship (east Poland)
Szklarnia, Greater Poland Voivodeship (west-central Poland)
Szklarnia, Gliwice County in Silesian Voivodeship (south Poland)
Szklarnia, Lubliniec County in Silesian Voivodeship (south Poland)
Szklarnia, Mrągowo County in Warmian-Masurian Voivodeship (north Poland)
Szklarnia, Ostróda County in Warmian-Masurian Voivodeship (north Poland)
Szklarnia, Szczytno County in Warmian-Masurian Voivodeship (north Poland)